SS Lorrin A. Thurston was a British merchant ship of World War II. A Liberty ship built in the United States in 1943, she was renamed SS Samcalia before completion, and was transferred to the British Ministry of War Transport, with Furness Withy as managers. Sold to her managers after the war, she was renamed SS Pacific Liberty in 1947. Resold in 1954, she passed through several owners, being renamed Phoebus in 1954, Bayhorse in 1963, and San Gabriel in 1970, before being scrapped in 1971. Her original namesake was Lorrin A. Thurston, a Hawaiian-American lawyer, politician, and businessman.

Design 

Most Liberty ships were named after prominent deceased Americans.

Construction and career 
The keel of the ship was laid down on 18 August 1943 at the California Shipbuilding Corporation's yard in Los Angeles. She was launched on 10 September 1943 under the name Lorrin A. Thurston. She was transferred to the British Government later that year to be completed with the name Samcalia, with Furness Withy as managers. She survived the war, and in 1947, she was sold to Furness Withy, who renamed her Pacific Liberty.

She was sold again in 1954 to Febo Amadeo Bertorello, of Genoa, who renamed her Phoebus. They operated her until 1963, when they sold her to Seatide Shipping, of Monrovia, who renamed her Bayhorse. They in turn sold her in 1970 to Cia de Naviera Houston S.A., of Panama, who renamed her San Gabriel, before scrapping her the following year. She arrived at Split on 21 January 1971 to be broken up.

References

 

Liberty ships
Ships built in Los Angeles
1943 ships
World War II merchant ships of the United Kingdom